Symphony No. 1 in C minor, Op. 11, is a work by Felix Mendelssohn, completed on 31 March 1824, when the composer was only 15 years old. The autograph score was published in 1831.

History
The work was premièred at a private gathering on 14 November 1824 to honor his sister Fanny Mendelssohn's 19th birthday.  Its public première occurred on 1 February 1827, with the Leipzig Gewandhaus Orchestra performing.

London première
The symphony was dedicated to the Philharmonic Society, who performed the London première on May 25, 1829, with Mendelssohn conducting. For this performance Mendelssohn  orchestrated the scherzo from his Octet Op. 20 as an alternative third movement for the symphony.

The London première was reviewed in The Harmonicon:

... though only about one or two-and-twenty years of age, he has already produced several works of magnitude, which, if at all to be compared with the present, ought, without such additional claim, to rank him among the first composers of the age.... Fertility of invention and novelty of effect, are what first strike the hearers of M. Mendelssohn's symphony; but at the same time, the melodiousness of its subjects, the vigour with which these are supported, the gracefulness of the slow movement, the playfulness of some parts, and the energy of others, are all felt.... The author conducted it in person, and it was received with acclamations....

Instrumentation
The work is scored for two flutes, two oboes, two clarinets in B, two bassoons, two horns in E and/or C, two trumpets in C, timpani in C, G, and strings.

Movements

The symphony is in four movements:

A typical performance lasts approximately half an hour.

Arrangements
An arrangement by Mendelssohn himself for piano four hands, violin and cello exists, and has been recorded by the Duo Tal & Groethuysen with Oliver Wille (violin) and Mikayel Hakhnazaryan (cello).

References

External links

Symphonies by Felix Mendelssohn
1824 compositions
Compositions in C minor